Mohammad Ali Safa was born on March 7, 1950, in Bojnord, North Khorasan Province, Iran. He was a commando of the Bushehr Marine Rangers Battalion. He was involved in operations in the Battle of Khorramshahr and Siege of Abadan, and was killed on October 26, 1980, with mortar shell shrapnel in Abadan, Abadan County, Khuzestan Province, Iran.

Early life
Mohammad Ali Safa was born in Bojnord on March 7, 1950, and after completing his elementary education at "Ibn Sina" Elementary School, he completed his secondary education at "Hemmat" Bojnord High School.

In his early years, Mohammad Ali had a keen interest in the various martial arts, including Karate and Kung fu. He believed that all Iranians should serve and defend their country. So Mohammad Ali entered the army on the basis of his beliefs in December 1964.

Career
Mohammad Ali Safa joined Iranian Army in December 1964. After 18 months of rigorous and intensive commando training in Iran, led by Royal Marines Base Commanders, Safa was selected as the top person in Special Operations and for initial training, he was sent to the Royal Marines Command Base in England. In fact, he had been sent for specialized training in tank hunting.

Outside of Iran, he spent one year for commando training courses such as S. P. S., Tank Hunting, Parachuting, Tarzan Japanese Special Courses, Martial courses included Judo, Kung Fu and Land, Sea and Air combat courses. Mohammad Ali was distinguished in all these courses. His efforts led him to obtain the title and degree of tank hunter specialist from the Royal Marines Command Base.

Mohammad Ali Safa participated in the Navy commando entrance test. In this test, 250 military units were selected and trained for 18 months. Safa was selected to lead the Special Operations Command and was sent to the Royal Marines Command Base, England, along with eight others to continue specialized training.

Since Mohammad Ali Safa had successfully completed these courses in England and earned the title of "Premier Commando", he went to John F. Kennedy Special Warfare Center and School to learn specialized training on warship destruction. After training in various courses in the United States, he received a specialized commando specialty, Destruction of Warships, for the first time among Iranian.

He was also chosen for commando training in the harsh conditions called "Long Hope" in the Brazilian Amazon forest because of the great courage he had shown himself in training operations.

Since he had a strong interest in the homeland and serving the Iranian people, so returned to the country and in the first act, began to train Iranian commandos at the Army Naval Command Base in Bushehr.

Getting injured
In May 1979, when Khorramshahr was threatened by counter-revolutionary forces and separatist rebels, Mohammad Ali Safa went to Khorramshahr as Commander of Iranian Navy Special Commandos with help of Mohammad Jahanara. They cleared Khorramshahr from armed counter-revolutionaries that has advanced weapons, but Mohammad Ali Safa was shot and wounded in the abdomen during clashes with counter-revolutionary forces.

After being injured, Mohammad Ali was taken to hospital and after three surgeries, some parts of his intestines was removed, but with his strong morale, he was able to regain his health. When Iran-Iraq war began, Mohammad Ali was on medical leave for two years but prepared to fight the invading enemy. He believed he had to use his expertise that earns in several different countries to serve the country and train the army.

His role in the Iran-Iraq War
In the Iran-Iraq War, Mohammad Ali Safa along with the other commanders of Bushehr Navy, destroyed 500 of the T-72 and Type 74 tanks held by the Iraqi Army. They pushed the Iraqi army back and due to the heavy damage inflicted on Saddam's tanks by the Iran's Navy commandos, he named Khorramshahr as cemetery of his tanks division.

During the war with Iraqi army, Mohammad Ali Safa was dubbed the "Tank Hunter" by disrupting more than 160 Iraqi tanks with BGM-71 TOW rocket launchers.

Death
Mohammad Ali Safa was killed on 26 October 1980 by mortar explosion with shrapnel wounds to the forehead, leg and side.

After death of Mohammad Ali Safa, a letter of condolence was sent from the Royal Marines Command Base of United Kingdom to Iran, expressing sympathy for the death of Mohammad Ali Safa, announced that the flag of Royal Marines Command Base was flown at half-mast for three days because of his death.

Statue
After the death of Mohammad Ali Safa, a statue was erected at the Royal Marines Base and its flag was half-raised for three days. This Royal Marines act, demonstrates Safa's abilities.

Documentary film about him
In 2013, a documentary film about Mohammad Ali Safa's biography was produced in Iran by Department of Preservation and Dissemination of Holy Defense Values of North Khorasan.

See also
 Iran–Iraq War
 Liberation of Khorramshahr
 Battle of Khorramshahr
 Siege of Abadan
 Islamic Republic of Iran Navy
 History of the Iranian Navy
 Iran's Navy Ranks Insignia

References

External links
 IRIB News
 Mashregh News
 Defapress News
 Mohammad Ali Safa on Iran Army website

1950 births
1980 deaths
Islamic Republic of Iran Army personnel of the Iran–Iraq War
People from North Khorasan Province
Iranian military personnel killed in the Iran–Iraq War
Iranian Navy personnel